Miesenbach may refer to the following places:

Miesenbach, Lower Austria, a municipality in Lower Austria, Austria
Miesenbach bei Birkfeld, a municipality in Styria, Austria
Miesenbach, a part of Ramstein-Miesenbach, Rhineland-Palatinate, Germany